The 1900 Paris–Roubaix was the fifth edition of the Paris–Roubaix, a classic one-day cycle race in France. The single-day event was held on 15 April 1900 and stretched  from Paris to its end in a velodrome in Roubaix. The winner was Émile Bouhours from France.

Results

References

Paris–Roubaix
Paris–Roubaix
Paris–Roubaix
Paris–Roubaix